Sands of Iwo Jima is a 1949 war film starring John Wayne that follows a group of United States Marines from training to the Battle of Iwo Jima during World War II. The film, which also features John Agar, Adele Mara and Forrest Tucker, was written by Harry Brown and James Edward Grant, and directed by Allan Dwan. The picture was a Republic Pictures production.

Sands of Iwo Jima was nominated for Academy Awards for Best Actor in a Leading Role (John Wayne), Best Film Editing, Best Sound Recording (Daniel J. Bloomberg) and Best Writing, Motion Picture Story.

Plot
Corporal Robert Dunne recounts the story of tough-as-nails career Marine Sergeant John Stryker. Initially he is greatly disliked by the men of his squad, particularly the combat replacements, for the rigorous training he puts them through. He is especially despised by PFC Peter "Pete" Conway, the arrogant, college-educated son of Colonel Sam Conway, whom Stryker served under and admired, and PFC Al Thomas who blames him for his demotion.

When Stryker leads his squad in the invasion of Tarawa, the men begin to appreciate his methods. The platoon commander, Lieutenant Baker, is killed seconds after he lands on the beach, and PFCs "Farmer" Soames and Choynski are wounded. The Marines are pinned down by a pillbox. Several more men are killed before Stryker is able to demolish the pillbox. Later on, Thomas stops for coffee when he goes to get ammunition for two comrades. As a result, he returns too late — the two Marines run out of ammunition, and Hellenopolis is killed, while Bass is badly wounded. On their first night, the squad is ordered to dig in and hold their positions. Alone and wounded, Bass begs for help. Conway considers Stryker brutal and unfeeling when he refuses to disobey orders and go to Bass's rescue. After the battle, when Stryker discovers about Thomas's dereliction, he gets into a fistfight with him. A passing officer spots this serious offense, but Thomas claims that Stryker was merely teaching him judo. Later, a guilt-ridden Thomas abjectly apologizes to Stryker for his dereliction of duty.

Back on leave, Stryker reveals a softer side while on leave in Honolulu. He picks up a bargirl and goes with her to her apartment. He becomes suspicious when he hears somebody in the next room, but upon investigation, finds only a hungry baby boy. Stryker gives the woman some money and leaves. Later, during a training exercise, McHugh, a replacement, drops a live hand grenade. Everybody drops to the ground, except Conway, who is distracted reading a letter from his wife. Stryker knocks him down, saving his life, and then proceeds to bawl him out in front of the platoon.

Stryker and his squad are deployed to the battle of Iwo Jima where they suffer heavy casualties within the first couple of hours. Stryker's squad is selected to be a part of the 40-man patrol assigned to charge up Mount Suribachi. During the charge, Eddie Flynn, Stein, and Fowler are killed. While the men are resting during a lull in the fighting, Stryker is shot dead by a Japanese soldier emerging from a spider hole. The remaining squad members find a letter he wrote but never sent to his son. In it, Stryker expresses emotions he wanted to say to him but never did. Moments later, the surviving squad members witness the iconic flag raising on Iwo Jima.

Cast

 John Wayne as Sgt. John M. Stryker
 John Agar as PFC Peter T. "Pete" Conway
 Adele Mara as Allison Bromley
 Forrest Tucker as PFC Al J. Thomas
 Wally Cassell as PFC Benny A. Regazzi
 James Brown as PFC Charlie Bass
 Richard Webb as PFC "Handsome" Dan Shipley
 Arthur Franz as Corporal Robert C. Dunne/Narrator
 Julie Bishop as Mary (the bargirl)
 James Holden as PFC "Farmer" Soames
 Peter Coe as PFC George Hellenopolis
 Richard Jaeckel as PFC Frank Flynn
 William Murphy as PFC Eddie Flynn
 Martin Milner as Pvt Mike McHugh
 George Tyne as PFC Hart S. Harris
 Hal Baylor as Pvt J.E. "Ski" Choynski (credited as Hal Fieberling)
Leonard Gumley as Pvt Sid Stein
William Self as Pvt L.D. Fowler Jr.
John McGuire as Captain Joyce

Production

Writing
The film was based on a screenplay by Harry Brown and James Edward Grant from a story by Harry Brown.

The script is the first known work to use the military idiom "lock and load", an expression meaning "get ready to fight". Although the original use and implied meaning are disputed, it typically described the action of arming an M1 Garand rifle by first locking the bolt back by pulling the charging handle rearward and then loading an 8 round clip into its magazine.

Casting
The production used actual combat veterans from Iwo Jima in the film. The three survivors of the five Marines (Rene Gagnon, and Ira Hayes) and a Navy corpsman (John Bradley)who were credited with raising the second flag on Mount Suribachi during the actual battle appear briefly in the film just before the flag raising scene. Hayes was made the subject of a film biography, The Outsider, and Bradley the subject of a book by his son James, Flags of Our Fathers. Subsequent research has established that the figures identified in the flag raising photograph as Bradley and Gagnon were actually Marine PFC Harold Schultz and Marine Cpl Harold Keller.

Also appearing as themselves are 1st Lt. Harold Schrier, who led the flag-raising patrol up Mount Suribachi on Iwo Jima and helped raise the first flag, Col. David M. Shoup, later Commandant of the Marine Corps and recipient of the Medal of Honor at Tarawa, and Lt. Col. Henry P. "Jim" Crowe, commander of the 2nd Battalion 8th Marines at Tarawa, where he earned the U.S. Navy Cross. Additionally, "nearly 2,000 Marines were used as extras" during filming.

The cast of John Wayne, John Agar, Forrest Tucker, and Richard Jaeckel would reunite in the 1970 western Chisum .

Filming
The movie was made on location in California. Scenes were filmed at the Marine Corps Base at Camp Pendleton, Leo Carrillo State Beach, Santa Catalina Island, Channel Islands, Janss Conejo Ranch, Thousand Oaks, Republic Studios and Universal Studios. Actual combat footage from the Pacific War was also used in the film.

Legacy
The film received four nominations at the 22nd Academy Awards, including John Wayne for Best Actor, his first nomination in the category. It won no awards. A sequel to the film starring Wayne, called Devil Birds, was planned but never materialized.

In the television show King of the Hill (1997–2010), this is the favorite film of Cotton Hill, father of main character Hank Hill. Hank recalls that, during his childhood, his father would travel around Texas searching for showings of this film.

The episode "Call of Silence" (2004) in NCIS'''s season 2 references the film and a documentary as shared background to Marine history and legacy. The episode shows the NCIS character Timothy McGee watching the documentary To the Shores of Iwo Jima; the character Anthony DiNozzo approaches and, in furtherance of the character's schtick as an avowed and knowledgeable movie buff, begins talking about the theatrical film Sands of Iwo Jima, some scenes of which were taken from the documentary.

The Southern rock band Drive-By Truckers have a song title "The Sands of Iwo Jima" on their 2004 album The Dirty South. It is sung from the perspective of a young boy who has been exposed to World War 2 through old John Wayne movies. He asks his great-uncle, a World War II veteran, if The Sands of Iwo Jima'' represents the war properly; the old man smiles, shakes his head and responds, "I never saw John Wayne on the sands of Iwo Jima."

See also
 John Wayne filmography

References

External links

 
 
 
 

1949 films
1940s war drama films
American war drama films
American black-and-white films
Battle of Iwo Jima films
Pacific War films
Films set in Kiribati
Republic Pictures films
Films directed by Allan Dwan
Films with screenplays by Harry Brown (writer)
Films scored by Victor Young
Films about the United States Marine Corps
1949 drama films
Films shot in California
1940s English-language films
1940s American films